VTEC is Variable Valve Timing and Lift Electronic Control, a system developed by Honda for combustion engines.

VTEC or VTech may also refer to:

 VTech, a Hong Kong global supplier of electronic learning products
 Virgin Trains East Coast, a former train operating company in the United Kingdom
 Verotoxin-producing Escherichia coli, strains of the bacterium Escherichia coli
 Valid Time Event Code, used by the United States National Weather Service to automate and disseminate critical weather information

See also
 Ventricular tachycardia (V-tach)
 VA Tech (disambiguation)